Siege of Rennes may refer to:

 Siege of Rennes (1356–57), during the War of the Breton Succession
 Siege of Rennes (1491), during the French–Breton War